Muḥsin ibn Ḥusayn ibn Ḥasan ibn Abī Numayy was Emir of Mecca and ruler of the Hejaz in partnership with Idris ibn Hasan from 1603 to 1624, then independently from 1624 to 1628.

Muhsin was born in Jumada I 984 AH (August/September 1576). He was raised by his uncle Abu Talib ibn Hasan.

After the death of Sharif Abu Talib in Jumada II 1012 AH (November 1603), the ashraf of Mecca elected Idris ibn Hasan as Emir, with his brother Fuhayd and nephew Muhsin as co-Emirs. Fuhayd and Muhsin were included in the du'a alongside Idris, and were together allotted a quarter of the Emirate's income. Sultan Ahmed I confirmed the appointment of the three sharifs, and sent a decree that was read out in the Masjid al-Haram on Wednesday, 11 Safar 1013 AH (7 July 1604).

In late Rabi II 1019 AH (July 1610), Idris and Muhsin deposed Fuhayd.

On Thursday, 4 Muharram 1034 AH (16 October 1624) the ashraf deposed Idris and proclaimed Muhsin as sole Emir of Mecca. He received an official decree from Sultan Murad IV in Ramadan (June 1625).

In mid-Ramadan 1037 AH (May 1628) Muhsin surrendered the Emirate to Ahmad ibn Abd al-Muttalib, then departed to Yemen. He died near Sanaa on 6 Ramadan 1038 AH (29 April 1629). He was buried in Sanaa, and a qubba was built over his grave.

References

Sources
 
 
 
 

1576 births
1629 deaths
Banu Qatadah
16th-century Arabs
17th-century Arabs